This is a List of Colorado Buffaloes bowl games. The Colorado Buffaloes have played in 29 bowl games in their history, compiling a record of 12–17.

Bowl games

References

Colorado Buffaloes

Colorado Buffaloes bowl games